The Second Federal Electoral District of Quintana Roo (II Distrito Electoral Federal de Quintana Roo) is one of the 300 Electoral Districts into which Mexico is divided for the purpose of elections to the federal Chamber of Deputies and one of three such districts in the state of Quintana Roo.

It elects one deputy to the lower house of Congress for each three-year legislative period, by means of the first past the post system.

District territory
Under the 2005 districting scheme, Quintana Roo's Second District covers the municipalities of
Othón P. Blanco, Felipe Carrillo Puerto and José María Morelos.

The district's head town (cabecera distrital), where results from individual polling stations are gathered together and collated, is the state capital, the city of Chetumal.

Previous districting schemes

1996–2005 district
Between 1996 and 2005, the Second District had exactly the same territory as at present.

Prior to 1975
Quintana Roo was admitted to the union on 8 October 1975. Prior to that, as a federal territory, it was allowed only one seat in the Chamber of Deputies (for the First District).
The Second District was created upon statehood in 1975, by halving the territory of the First District; it elected its first deputy, to the XLIX Legislature, in a special election.

Deputies returned to Congress from this district

XLIX Legislature
1975–1976: Héctor Esquiliano Solís (PRI)
L Legislature
1976–1979: Emilio Oxte Tah (PRI)
LI Legislature
1979–1982: Primitivo Alfonso Alcocer (PRI)
LII Legislature
1982–1985: Javier Sánchez Lozano (PRI)
LIII Legislature
1985–1988: Salvador Ramos Bustamante (PRI)
LIV Legislature
1988–1991: Isidoro Victoriano Mendoza de la Cruz (PRI)
LV Legislature
1991–1994: Magaly Achach (PRI)
LVI Legislature
1994–1997: Virginia Betanzos Moreno (PRI)
LVII Legislature
1997–2000: Artemio Caamal Hernández (PRI)
LVIII Legislature
2000–2003: Héctor Esquiliano Solís (PRI)
LIX Legislature
2003–2006: Víctor Manuel Alcérreca (PRI)
LX Legislature
2006–2009: Eduardo Espinosa Abuxapqui (PRI)

References and notes

Federal electoral districts of Mexico
Quintana Roo